John Barnhill Smith McGinley was a 20th-century Irish Anglican priest.

McGinley was educated at Trinity College, Dublin. He was ordained deacon in 1928 and priest in 1929. He was  Curate at Drumcondra  from 1928 to 1932 and then of Monkstown from 1932 to 1935. He held incumbencies at Ballyburly, Athy and Achill. He was Archdeacon of Glendalough from 1959 to 1970.

Notes

20th-century Irish Anglican priests
Archdeacons of Glendalough
Alumni of Trinity College Dublin